Cerconota tumulata is a moth of the family Depressariidae. It is found in French Guiana.

The wingspan is about 22 mm. The forewings are pale ochreous, becoming ochreous-brown towards the costa and termen, the costal edge fuscous. There is a large semi-fusiform violet patch extending along the dorsum from near the base to the tornus, widest in the middle, where it reaches half across the wing, and then gradually rounded-attenuated to a point at each end, its upper margin marked on the anterior half with a blackish-fuscous streak edged beneath with some yellowish-ferruginous suffusion. The hindwings are rather dark grey, the cell somewhat suffused with ochreous-whitish.

References

Moths described in 1916
Cerconota
Taxa named by Edward Meyrick